Georg Voggenreiter (20 September 1912 – 27 September 1986) was a German racing cyclist. He won the German National Road Race in 1947.

References

External links
 

1912 births
1986 deaths
German male cyclists
Sportspeople from Nuremberg
German cycling road race champions
Cyclists from Bavaria
20th-century German people